The 24th Quebec Cinema Awards were held on June 5, 2022, to honour achievements in the Cinema of Quebec in 2021. The ceremony was hosted by actress Geneviève Schmidt.

Actress Hélène Florent won both Best Actress for Drunken Birds (Les Oiseaux ivres) and Best Supporting Actress for Maria Chapdelaine, becoming the first actress in the history of the awards to win both categories in the same year.

Nominees and winners
Nominations were announced on April 14, 2022.

References

Quebec Cinema
2021 in Canadian cinema
2022 in Quebec
24
2021 awards in Canada